Cychrus sehnali is a species of ground beetle in the subfamily of Carabinae. It was described by Haeckel in 2007.

References

sehnali
Beetles described in 2007